The 2004–05 Toto Cup Al was the 21st season of the third most important football tournament in Israel since its introduction. This was the first edition to be played with clubs of the Israeli Permier League, after 5 seasons of joint competition with Israeli Premier League and Liga Leumit clubs.

The competition began on 6 August 2004 and ended on 6 April 2005, with Hapoel Petah Tikva beating F.C. Ashdod 4–2 on penalties after 3–3 in the final.

Format
The 12 Israeli Permier League clubs were split into three groups, each with 4 clubs. The two top clubs in each group, along with the two best third-placed clubs, advanced to the semi-finals.

Group stage
The matches were played from 6 August to 15 December 2004.

Group A

Group B

Group C

Elimination rounds

Quarter-finals

Semi-finals

Final

See also
 2004–05 Toto Cup Leumit
 2004–05 Toto Cup Artzit

References

External links
 Israel Toto Cup 2004/05 

Leumit
Toto Cup Leumit
Toto Cup Leumit